Stratton Mountain Resort is a ski area in the northeastern United States, located on Stratton Mountain in Stratton, Vermont, east of Manchester.

History
Stratton was established in December 1961 with three double chairlifts and a three-story base lodge. Although the mountain was top notch, the access road was a disaster; it was paved in 1962, prior to the second season, and two T-bar lifts were added in 1963 for the third season. Another double chairlift was opened and the base lodge was expanded for the 1966–67 season, giving way to the birth of European style après-ski entertainment by the Innsbruck Trio, a group of Austrian ski instructors. The group became known as the Stratton Mountain Boys and a key marketing component of the mountain.

In the early 1970s, following development of the initial terrain, Stratton began to develop a new beginner area; this opened in 1972 with additional trails, though plans for a new lift were not realized. In the late 1980s, Stratton constructed new terrain to the south of the main mountain, and dubbed it "Kidderbrook."  The expansion included a new quad chairlift, and was planned to be a starting point for potential additional terrain and housing in the area, though this never occurred.

In the late 1990s and early 2000s, the ski area constructed several new high-speed six-person lifts, and in 2007, the Kidderbrook Quad was removed and sold, as it was underused and Stratton's parent companies were in financial trouble at the time.  From 1985 to 2012, Stratton hosted the Burton U.S. Open Snowboarding Championships; the premier open snowboarding event in the country.  After a 27-year run at Stratton, the event moved in 2013 to Vail in Colorado.

Early years 
Lift served skiing debuted on the northern peak of the mountain when Stratton Mountain ski area opened with 3 double chairlifts (installed using a then-unique helicopter method) in December 1961. Designed by Gene Gillis of Sel Hannah's Sno Engineering firm, the area also sported a three-story base lodge.

While the facilities were top notch, the muddy access road was called a 'tank-proving ground' by the press. The road received much needed pavement in time for the area's second season. Stratton's uphill capacity was improved for its third season with the installation of two T-Bars. A sizable expansion took place the following season, when thirty acres of terrain, served by a new double chairlift, were opened in the new Snow Bowl. 1966–67 saw an expansion of the base lodge giving way to the regions first Apre' Ski parties and the birth of The Stratton Mountain Boys and the installation of another double chairlift. The Grizzly Bear and Polar Bear trails were added for the following season.

The Sun Bowl was developed for the 1968–69 season, adding a new base area,  of trails, and a new double chairlift. An additional two chairlift expansion was planned for the 1971–72 season, however Stratton became one of the first ski areas in the state to run into trouble with the new Act 250 law, when residents of Winhall forced the ski area to first overhaul its sewer system in advance of potential increases in skier visits. The Main Line pod was partially developed in the early 1970s, however development was halted prior to the installation of a chairlift. Snowmaking was expanded to the summit, circa 1974.

Also in 1974, James Sunday was paralyzed after a fall while skiing at Stratton. In a landmark decision three years later, Sunday was awarded $1.5 million by a jury. The decision resulted in significant price increases throughout the ski industry, due to skyrocketing liability insurance costs.

In 1978, Stratton hosted the World Cup tour, with technical events (giant slalom, slalom) for both men and women in early March. On the men's side, twenty-year-old American Phil Mahre won the GS and twin brother Steve took the slalom, as Ingemar Stenmark was shut out but made both podiums. Hanni Wenzel won the women's giant slalom and Perrine Pelen took the slalom; Cindy Nelson was the top women's finisher from the U.S., sixth in GS and fifth in slalom.

Moore and Munger, Inc. ownership 

Late in 1979, Stratton purchased nearby Bromley and assumed its multimillion-dollar debt. Stratton's debt was now reportedly up to $7 million. Moore and Munger, Inc. came to the rescue and purchased Stratton in early 1980. During the 1980s, Jake Burton found an ally in Stratton, when it became the first ski area to allow snowboarding. In addition to this, Stratton also became home to the first snowboard school, and started hosting US Open snowboard races in 1985. Stratton later became home to the first half pipe and formal terrain park on the east coast.

In the mid-1980s, in conjunction with the expansion of Stratton Village, the lift network at Stratton was modernized. Four new Poma chairlifts were installed in 1985 and 1986, replacing aging Heron-Pomas.

In the fall of 1987, Moore and Munger, Inc. sold Bromley to the owners of nearby Magic Mountain. The following year, the famous gondola was installed to the summit of Stratton.

Victoria USA, Inc. ownership 
In the spring of 1989, Victoria USA, Inc., a Japanese sporting goods company that owned Breckenridge, purchased Stratton. Later that year, the Kidderbrook area debuted. The Kidderbrook chairlift was the only lift installed during Victoria USA's ownership.

Intrawest ownership 
Intrawest purchased the ski area from Victoria USA, Inc. in 1994 and quickly started another round of new lift installations, eventually rolling out four new high speed six pack chairlifts. This project was named the "URSA" project after the Latin, bear, which represents their logo. The first of the high speed six packs arrived in 1995 with American Express. The lift used the same alignment as the Betwixt Double, which was dismantled. Standard Double and Suntanner Double were also removed to maintain capacity, as all three doubles were adjacent to one another and serviced the same terrain. In 1999, a new lift line was cut parallel to Grizzly Double and URSA Express was installed as the second high speed six pack. With this installation, Grizzly Double was removed and North American Quad was relocated two years later to maintain capacity. 2001 brought the final two high speed six packs, with Sun Bowl Quad being realigned so its lift line could be used for Sunrise Express and a new lift line cut above the top station of Sunrise Express for Shooting Star. Shooting Star allowed skiers to often bypass Kidderbrook on their ride to the top, and Kidderbrook became a secondary lift used only on crowded days. When Intrawest faced tough times, Stratton sold the often-idle Kidderbrook chairlift following the 2006-07 season.

Intrawest announced $6.5 million of projects for the 2013-2014 season, including new snowcats, improved snowmaking, two new glades, and base resort improvements. The aging gondola cabins were replaced the summer of 2014.

During Intrawest's ownership, Stratton developed premium real estate. The parking lot in front of Black Bear Lodge was cleared and became the Village Common. Two connected condominium buildings collectively named Long Trail House were constructed in 1999 and 2000. Long Trail was followed by Rising Bear Lodge in 2004, Hearthstone Lodge in 2005, and Founders Lodge in 2006. Construction began on an additional condominium building adjacent to Founders Lodge, but work stopped when the housing market started to collapse in late 2006. Additionally, townhouses were built on the mountain. Snowbridge was constructed from 1997-1998 on the trails "Old Log Road", "Ethan's Alley", and "Lower Wanderer" for ski-in/ski-out access. Solstice was constructed from 2001-2002 on the trails "91", "91 Extension", and "Solstice Way" for ski-in/ski-out access. TreeTop was built between 2003-2006 as ski-in properties off of the trail "TreeTop Way", but they could not be ski-out due to a contract signed with the Solstice homeowners forbidding the construction of additional ski-in/ski-out townhouses. In the late 2000s, Stratton sold 12 large plots of land above the Villager chairlift and called the ski-in/ski-out houses Tamarack Heights. This is the flagship community at Stratton and the final real estate project undertaken by Intrawest.

Alterra Mountain Company ownership 

In 2017, KSL Capital Partners and Henry Crown and Company acquired Intrawest, combining Stratton and an assortment of other mountains into a new company called Alterra Mountain Company. Over the summer of 2018, the resort installed a new high-speed quad chairlift to replace the aging Snow Bowl lift. Stratton began offering summertime mountain biking in 2019, with mountain bike trails opening in stages in 2019 and 2020.

Mountain statistics
There are eleven lifts, which can transport 33,928 people an hour.

Trails

(g) – gladed trail with trees
(m) – trail with moguls regularly when conditions provide

Lifts

Past Lifts

Future projects
Stratton is expected to open phases 2 and 3 of its mountain biking course in 2020.

References

External links

Alterra Mountain Company
Ski areas and resorts in Vermont
Buildings and structures in Windham County, Vermont
Tourist attractions in Windham County, Vermont